is a traditional Japanese textile that has been produced in Fukuoka Prefecture for more than 770 years.

 is most commonly found as the material for men's , though both men and women wear .  is also used to produce a number of different products not related to kimono and kimono accessories, such as handbags, neck ties and scarves.

History 

Six years later (1241 CE), they returned to Japan, with Yazaemon bringing along the technique of textile production which would later develop into  and utilising it to begin his textiles business.

250 years later in the 16th century, Yazaemon's descendant, Mitsuda Hikosaburo, returned to China (Ming dynasty) to further study in-depth the production of their textiles. Having learnt new Ming dynasty-period techniques, Hikosaburo then combined these with the Song dynasty-period textile techniques previously brought back by his ancestor.

The name  is taken from the location of the technique's original development within Japan (Hakata, Fukuoka Prefecture), and from the word , meaning weaving or fabric.

In 1600s, during Edo period (1603–1868), the feudal lord of the Fukuoka clan (Chikuzen Province), Nagamasa Kuroda, chose  textiles to be presented to the Tokugawa shogunate, Iemon Takewaka as tribute. The word  – sometimes used to describe  – derived from this action. In 1815, the textile became popular when a kabuki actor wore an  made from  onstage. It is favoured as an  fabric for its stiff, sturdy weave, making it easy to tie  knots (known as ) that will not slip and loosen with wear. Therefore, it was commonly worn by samurai who needed to tuck their  (sword) into the belt of their kimono. However, during the Meiji period,  for women were also developed.

Varieties

The  pattern features sets of long, uninterrupted stripes at each edge and in the centre of the fabric, and sets of patterned stripes either side of the central sets of lines.

Red was associated with happiness and prosperity; yellow was associated with sincerity and trust; blue was associated with honour and peace, and navy blue was associated with wisdom and solidity.

is the name used for  textiles that have multi-coloured designs. First woven in the Edo period (1603–1868), the technique of weaving  was developed further in the Meiji period, following the introduction of the Jacquard weaving machine to Japan in 1886.

Production process
 is made by weaving a thin warp yarn and a thicker weft yarn together in a tightly packed weave to create a stiff, ribbed appearance.

 (known as ) – the first stage of making . Both the pattern and the colour of the fabric are decided upon before being drawn onto the requisite plotting paper. 
 (known as ) – the second stage of production. For a silk  fabric, the yarns are first washed in soapy water, before the weft and warp yarns are dyed in a boiling dyebath, a process which requires a specialist craftsperson due to the sensitive nature of dyework. 
 (known as ) – the warp yarns are hooked onto the Jacquard loom, with the weaver able to manipulate the warps vertically by the use of foot pedals. 
 (known as ) – the thin warp yarns and thicker weft yarns are woven to create a ribbed-texture fabric, with the warp yarns forming the woven pattern on the fabric.

Uses
 is most commonly used as fabric for  worn with kimono by both men and women; it is a popular choice for men's  due to its stiff and tightly woven nature, particularly attractive when tying the knots used for men's .

Though most commonly seen in traditional clothing,  is also produced for use in accessories such as handbags, neck ties and card holders.

Trademark 
The trademark "" belongs to Hakataori Industrial Association. Their trademark is registered on March 9, 2017, with the registration number 5031531. The specifically trademarked products are silk textiles and Japanese cloth made in Fukuoka city, and other 21 cities which use the technique that originated in the Hakata area, Fukuoka Prefecture. Although section 3(1)(iii) of the Trade Mark Act says that a collective trademark cannot be registered as long as it contains a regional name or product name, if the product in question is considered to be "particularly distinctive", to the extent that of all people over Japan recognize it, an exception to this clause is made, allowing a trademark to be registered under section 3(2) of the Trade Mark Act. The purpose of regional collective trademark is to protect the regional brands that are not associated with specific commercial origin, but with geographical area.

The trademark was filed due to the concurrence of other enterprises engaged in similar business in the same geographical area, who, though not a member of the association, used a similar or identical trademark as the regional collective trademark. There are three parties who used the similar trademark as Hakataori Industrial Association and violated the Trade Mark Act and the Unfair Competition Prevention Act: Nihon Wasou Holdings, Inc., who sell Japanese clothing and other related items; the Hakata Takumi Kohgei Corporation, a subsidiary of Nihon Wasou Holdings, Inc., and sell ; and the Hakata Textile Products Association, who used a certificate stamp on their goods using the same trademark as Hakataori Industrial Association.

The second party, Hakata Takumi Kohgei Corporation, had asked to become a member of the Hakataori Industrial Association in order to use the same trademark, but were rejected. In March 2009, Hakataori Industrial Association warned Hakata Takumi Kohgei Corporation from using a similar trademark to theirs. In May 2010, Hakata Takumi Kohgei Corporation asked Hakataori Industrial Association once again and were again rejected.

Fukuoka District Court solved the problems between them by applying the Sec. 26(1)(ii) (acts of descriptive use), so that Hakata Takumi Kohgei Corporation could continue to use the trademark similar to that of the Hakataori Industrial Association's, with the caveat that the trademark could not be used in the same manner as before.

References

External links
Chikuzen Textile Group Hakata-ori Until It Can Be Made

Japanese words and phrases
Fukuoka Prefecture
Textile arts
Song dynasty art
Japanese art